Tobias Bong (born 23 March 1988) is a former German male canoeist who won medals at senior level the Wildwater Canoeing World Championships.

References

External links
 

1988 births
Living people
German male canoeists
Sportspeople from  Cologne